The Pune Municipal Corporation (PMC, IAST: Puṇe Mahānagarpālikā) is the civic body that governs the inner limits of Pune, India. It is in charge of the civic needs and infrastructure of the metropolis, which is spread over an area of 484.61 sq. km. and has 3.4 million residents. Established on 15 February 1950, the executive power of the PMC is vested in the Municipal Commissioner, an Indian Administrative Service (IAS) officer appointed by the Government of Maharashtra. The position is held by Vikram Kumar, IAS.The general body of the PMC consists of 162 directly elected councilors, popularly known as "corporators", headed by a mayor. Murlidhar Mohol (BJP) was elected as the mayor and Sunita Wadekar (RPI(A)) as the deputy mayor by the newly elected in April 2021. The land for Pune Municipal Corporation was donated by Late Hon. Shri. Bhausaheb Shirole (Patil) who was second Mayor of Pune city and later became an MLC. The Pune Municipal Corporation has launched an e-Governance initiative, with the goal of leveraging Information Technology to mobilize Government resources and optimize their utilization in order to provide a superior level of service.

Jurisdiction
The city comes under the Pune District, Maharashtra. The Collector is in charge of property records and revenue collection for the Central government. Appointed by the State government, the Collector also function as the election officer and conducts general as well as state elections in the city. The Pune City Police is the law enforcement agency in the city and answers to the Ministry of Home Affairs of the GoM. It is headed by a Police Commissioner, an Indian Police Service (IPS) officer.

In July 2017, eleven villages surrounding the city were merged in PMC bringing an additional area of 80.7 sq. km. and a population of 278,000 under the civic body's jurisdiction. PMC now governs a total area of 331.26 sq. km. The merged villages include: Uruli Devachi, Phursungi, Bavdhan Budruk, Lohegaon (remaining), Hadapsar (Sadesatra Nali), Mundhwa (Keshavnagar area), Shivane (remaining), Dhayari (remaining), Undri, Ambegaon Khurda and Ambegaon Budruk. This merger was preceded by the merger of 23 villages in 1997.

On December 23, 2020, the state government issued a draft notification for the merger of 23 adjoining villages within PMC limits, namely Mhalunge, Sus, Bavdhan Budhruk, Kirkatwadi, Pisoli, Kondhwe-Dhawade, Kopre, Nanded, Khadakwasla, Manjari Budhruk, Narhe, Holkarwadi, Autade-Handewadi, Wadachiwadi, Shewalewadi, Nandoshi, Sanasnagar, Mangdewadi, Bhilarewadi, Gujar Nimbalkarwadi, Jambhulwadi, Kolewadi and Wagholi. The total area of the PMC would be around 485 sq km making it the municipal corporation with the largest area in the state.

To serve citizens better, PMC has taken initiative for e-Governance. Presently a few big corporations like Persistent Systems are lending help for developing the E-governance system, as a part of their social service initiative. A public-private partnership is perceived to bring tremendous changes in the future.

Administration 
The major responsibility of PMC is to look after the civic and infrastructural needs of the citizens. The administration consists of two major branches: the executive branch headed by the Municipal Commissioner and the deliberative branch headed by the Mayor.

Executive Branch 
The executive branch is headed by the Municipal Commissioner appointed by the State government from the Indian Administrative Service for a term not exceeding three years according to Section 36 of the Maharashtra Municipal Corporation Act, 1949. Additional Municipal Commissioner(s) assist the Municipal Commissioner in the administration of the departments deputed to them. As of April 2018, there are three Additional Commissioners supervising the general, special and estate administration of the city. Each of these categories consist of several departments. The Municipal Commissioner also serves on the boards of directors of the two public transport companies, PMPML and MahaMetro.

Administrative Zones 
For the convenience of administration, the city is divided into five zones each headed by a Deputy Municipal Commissioner. Each zone consists of three ward offices (Marathi: क्षेत्रिय कार्यालय, IAST: Kṣhetriya Kāryālay) overseen by an Assistant Municipal Commissioner. A ward office typically has jurisdiction over more than one election ward. Ward offices not only coordinate major civic projects in their respective areas but also deal with minor works such as maintenance and repair. Residents can avail municipal services at their local ward office eliminating the need to visit the PMC headquarters.

Deliberative Branch 
The deliberative branch is the elected branch of the PMC headed by the Mayor. The city is divided into 41 multi-member wards (Marathi: प्रभाग, IAST: Prabhāg), 39 of which are represented by four corporators each while two are represented by three corporators each. Thus, the general body of the PMC consists of 162 corporators. They are elected for a five year term by adult franchise in municipal elections. All major political parties active in the state contest the elections.

The corporators elect the Mayor, a ceremonial position with limited duties who acts as an ambassador and representative of the city, as well as a Deputy Mayor. The corporators approve the city budget and act as watchdogs on implementation of policy by the staff under the Municipal Commissioner.

Committees 
The corporators form several committees which deliberate on various issues. At present, PMC has the following subject committees: Law, City  Development, Women and Child Welfare, and Sports. The Standing Committee is the perhaps the most important committee of the PMC formed according to Section 20 of Maharashtra Municipal Corporation Act, 1949. It consists of 16 members headed by a President appointed at the first meeting of the newly elected Corporation, half of whom retire every succeeding year. A new President is also appointed every year. The Standing Committee along with 15 ward committees are together responsible for financial approvals.

Revenue sources 

The following are the Income sources for the Corporation from the Central and State Government.

Revenue from taxes 
Following is the Tax related revenue for the corporation.

 Property tax.
 Profession tax.
 Entertainment tax.
 Grants from Central and State Government like Goods and Services Tax.
 Advertisement tax.

Revenue from non-tax sources 

Following is the Non Tax related revenue for the corporation.

 Water usage charges.
 Fees from Documentation services.
 Rent received from municipal property.
 Funds from municipal bonds.

Municipal elections

2012 
Municipal elections were held on 16 February 2012 to elect a total of 152 councillors in 76 wards (2 per ward). Vaishali Bankar (NCP) and Deepak Mankar (Congress) were elected as the Mayor and Deputy Mayor respectively.

2017 

Municipal Elections were held on 21 February 2017 to elect a total of 162 councillors in 41 wards. The BJP won an absolute majority in the 2017 elections, marking the first time the city got a mayor from the party. Mukta Tilak (BJP) was elected as the mayor and Navanth Kamble (RPI (A)) as the deputy mayor by the newly elected general body in March 2017. Tilak is the first member of the BJP to hold the position. Following Kamble's demise while in office, Siddharth Dhende of the RPI (A) was elected as the deputy mayor in June 2017.

Bypolls 
The demise of the Deputy Mayor Navnath Kamble (RPI (A)) in May 2017 necessitated by-elections in the Koregaon Park-Ghorpadi ward. The RPI (A) retained the seat with Himali Kamble elected as the new councillor. Another round of bypolls was held on 4 April 2018 following the death of ex-mayor Chanchala Kodre NCP , who was elected in 2017 from the Mundhwa-Magarpatta ward. NCP retained the seat and Puja Kodre was elected as the new councillor.

Mayors List

See also 
 Pimpri-Chinchwad Municipal Corporation
 Pune Cantonment Board

References

External links 
  of PMC
 
 

Government of Pune
 
Municipal corporations in Maharashtra
1950 establishments in Bombay State
Government agencies established in 1950